Prince Hussain Aga Khan (born April 10, 1974, in Geneva, Switzerland) is the third child and second son of Aga Khan IV and his first wife, Princess Salimah Aga Khan.

Early life and education

He attended Deerfield Academy and subsequently Williams College, from which he graduated in 1997 with a dual degree in theatre and French literature. In 2004, he received a Master of International Affairs degree from Columbia’s School of International and Public Affairs, where his main area of study was Economic and Political Development with a regional focus on the Middle East and North Africa.

Nature and Photography

Hussain has been an avid tropical fish hobbyist since the age of five and a reptile and amphibian enthusiast since he was 14, when he started scuba diving and developed a keen interest in conservation. He started travelling to the tropics frequently after secondary school and began taking photographs of fauna and flora on a trip to the Brazilian Amazon in 1996.

An assembly of his rainforest photographs from seven countries, entitled Rainforests and including statistics related to deforestation and biodiversity, appeared in three exhibits in the US in 2004.

His photographs, including those focused on rainforests, have been published in Animal Voyage in 2004 (a new edition was printed in 2007). Since 2009 his focus has mainly been on underwater photography, especially of turtles, sharks, whales and dolphins. His second book, Diving into Wildlife (2015) contains a selection of these images. Some of Hussain's photographs have also appeared on National Geographic blogs.

His work has also been exhibited in Geneva (Switzerland), in Paris at the Maison Européenne de la Photographie (2007), at the Oceanographic Museum of Monaco for the Blue Ocean Film Festival and for the 10-year anniversary of Prince Albert’s foundation (2015 and 2016 respectively), and at the IUCN ocean conference in Hawaii in 2016. His photography was featured at the Sustainable Blue Economy Conference in Nairobi (2018) and, most recently, his photography of ocean life was on display at the National Museum of Natural History and Science of the University of Lisbon from September 27 to December 29, 2019, in an exhibition called "The Living Sea: Photographic Essay by Hussain Aga Khan".

Career 
Prince Hussain has been based in France and working with the Aga Khan Trust for Culture. Following completion of a master's degree in international affairs from Columbia’s School of International and Public Affairs in 2004, Prince Hussain assumed additional responsibility at the Aga Khan Foundation for the conceptualisation of programmes on environmental issues.

Hussain is chair of the board of the Aga Khan Agency for Habitat, where he focuses mainly on disaster risk reduction and emergency management in Central Asia, Pakistan and India. He also serves on the board of the Aga Khan Trust for Culture (AKTC), and sits on the AKDN Committee, the oversight body of the Aga Khan Development Network. Involvement with the Aga Khan Foundation (AKF) has centered on the management of the Prince Sadruddin Aga Khan Fund for the Environment. More recently, Hussain joined his brother, Prince Rahim, and key directors of AKDN agencies as a member of the Environment and Climate Change Committee (ECC) in order to work on environmental issues and the impact of climate change in some of AKDN’s priority countries.

Prince Hussain was given the key to the city of Sugar Land, Texas in 2007, and was made an Honorary Ambassador of the city of Edmonton in 2007.

Focused On Nature, the small conservation fund that Hussain established with Nazir Sunderji in 2014, has mainly supported the conservation of sharks, cetaceans, rainforests, African elephants and rhinoceroses. Smaller or infrequent grants have gone to the preservation of manta rays, orangutans, endangered amphibians in Central America as well as to a few key and historic environmental organizations. Should FON grow, Hussain would like to further address great apes, expand and deepen his commitment to oceans, forests and the aforementioned species.

Personal life

On April 27, 2006, the Prince announced his intention to marry Kristin J. White (born 1976), an American whom he met while both were attending graduate school at Columbia. The intended bride, who has a master's degree in public health, converted to Islam and took the name Khaliya Aga Khan. Prince Hussain and Princess Khaliya were married religiously on Saturday September 16, 2006, by Sayyed Mohammad Masawi at Château de Chantilly. Friday September 15 was the civil ceremony at their home in Aiglemont, France, by Mayor of Gouvieux, Patrice Marchand. Prince Hussain and Princess Khaliya divorced in 2011.

In December 2018, His Highness the Aga Khan announced the engagement of Prince Hussain and Elizabeth Hoag, a mental health counselor from Connecticut specializing in anxiety disorders. The couple married in a private ceremony in Geneva on September 27, 2019, with the bride adopting the name Fareen upon embracing Islam.

References

1974 births
Aga Khan Development Network
Living people
Deerfield Academy alumni
Williams College alumni
School of International and Public Affairs, Columbia University alumni
Noorani family
Swiss people of Iranian descent
Swiss people of Pakistani descent
Swiss people of English descent